Tamás Sors (born 27 May 1991) is a Hungarian Paralympic swimmer. He has won two gold medals in the 100m butterfly event at the Paralympic Games, the first at the 2008 Summer Paralympics in Beijing and the second at the 2012 Summer Paralympics in London.

References

Hungarian male swimmers
Swimmers at the 2008 Summer Paralympics
Swimmers at the 2012 Summer Paralympics
Paralympic gold medalists for Hungary
Paralympic silver medalists for Hungary
Paralympic bronze medalists for Hungary
Living people
1991 births
Medalists at the 2008 Summer Paralympics
Medalists at the 2012 Summer Paralympics
S9-classified Paralympic swimmers
Sportspeople from Pécs
Medalists at the 2016 Summer Paralympics
Medalists at the World Para Swimming Championships
Medalists at the World Para Swimming European Championships
Paralympic medalists in swimming
Paralympic swimmers of Hungary
Hungarian male freestyle swimmers